Finn Hald (8 July 1929 – 17 October 2010) was a Norwegian ceramist, sculptor, illustrator, poet and playwright. He was married to Dagny Revold. Among his books are Revestreker from 1970 and the short story collection Fuglesirkuset from  1978. He published Mellom to stoler from 1980, Sidespor from 1986 and Oppsving from 1996, all in collaboration with his wife Dagny Hald and designer Roar Høyland.

References

1929 births
2010 deaths
Artists from Oslo
Norwegian ceramists
Norwegian illustrators
Norwegian male poets
Norwegian male dramatists and playwrights
20th-century Norwegian poets
20th-century Norwegian dramatists and playwrights
20th-century Norwegian male writers